Mazz is a Tejano band originally from Brownsville, Texas. The band was known for their idiosyncratic and innovative form of Tejano cumbia which made them distinguishable among their counterparts. Mazz became one of the most popular Tejano music bands during the genre's 1990s golden age. Mazz won the Latin Grammy Award for Best Tejano Album in 2001, 2002, 2003, 2004, and in 2009, the most wins for a Tejano musician. They landed their first major recording contract with EMI Latin in the early 1990s, before switching to Freddie Records in 1999. Joe Lopez and Jimmy Gonzalez formed Mazz in 1978 before disbanding and creating smaller bands throughout their careers. Gonzalez was known for blending a variety of genres into his basic Tejano sound, a formula he continued to use up until his final release, Porque Todavía te Quiero (2018). Gonzalez was pronounced dead in San Antonio, Texas on June 6, 2018, after suffering from low blood sugar as a result of his diabetes.

History
Mazz was founded by Joe Lopez and Jimmy Gonzalez in 1978. Grupo Mazz were known for using the synthesizer and blending rock and roll into their original Tejano music sound. They earned a marketing contract with Coors in the mid-1980s that provided the band with exposure. The marketing success of Coors enabled the band to tour in Florida, California, and much of the southwest and Pacific coast states of the United States. The band's repertoire included award-winning songwriter Luis Silva who provided the band's earliest success with "Laura Ya No Vive Aquí", "Olvidaré Tu Nombre", and "Otra Vez". Grupo Mazz began receiving top honors at the Tejano Music Awards, winning Single of the Year, Best Tejano Album, Male Vocalist of the Year, and Showband of the Year. By 1986, Grupo Mazz began selling 50,000 units and became one of the top-selling Tejano acts. The group had a reputation as being "bad boys" of the Tejano music industry, they were known to be late at their shows. The single "Laura Ya No Vive Aqui" peaked atop Billboards Latin music charts in March 1987. The band's 1987 album Beyond took Album of the Year honors at the 1988 Tejano Music Awards, while Lopez and Gonzalez won Vocal Duo of the Year.

In 1988, Mazz signed with CBS Records and released Straight from the Heart (1989), the following year they signed with EMI Latin. At the 1990 Tejano Music Awards, Grupo Mazz took Songwriter of the Year (Lopez), Vocal Duo of the Year, and Song of the Year (for "Now I Want You to Love Me") honors. The band's album No Te Olvidare (1990) reached atop the Billboard Regional Mexican Albums chart in July 1990. It spent five consecutive months at number two behind Bronco. In March 1990, the album received a gold award from EMI Latin, signifying 50,000 units sold. That July, the company announced that No Te Olvidare sold 75,000 units in the United States. Mazz performed at RodeoHouston for 14 consecutive years, starting in 1991 as part of Go Tejano Day.

Lopez and Gonzalez separated in 1998 and pursued solo careers with their own bands. Gonzalez signed a recording contract with Freddie Records in 1999. Mazz won the Latin Grammy Award for Best Tejano Album in 2001, 2002, 2003, 2004, and in 2009, the most wins for a Tejano musician. Mazz's albums No Te Olvidare, Para Nuestra Gente, Una Noche Juntos, and Mazz Romanticos Que Nunca, sold 100,000 units each by June 2018.

Gonzalez's death 
As Gonzalez's health condition began to deteriorate as a diabetic, the singer began sitting during his performances. In February 2018, Gonzalez was hospitalized after a show for breathing problems. Following a show on June 5, Gonzalez planned on returning to Brownsville. The singer decided to see relatives in San Antonio and was hospitalized on June 5 following a drop in blood sugar. Gonzalez suffered from cardiac arrest but was momentarily revived, however, he was pronounced dead on Wednesday, June 6, 2018, from complications of diabetes. Within hours of the announcement, Tejano musicians took to social media about Gonzalez. Musicians who held tributes to Gonzalez on their social media includes, Shelly Lares, David Lee Garza, and Raulito Navaira (brother of Emilio Navaira who died two years earlier). Tejano music stations in San Antonio began playing Mazz's songs non-stop following the announcement of his death.

The group were scheduled to perform at the Shrimporee in Aransas Pass on June 9. Mazz was also scheduled to perform during the Puro Tejano Texas Showdown on June 23 and June 24, 2018, as part of the Puro Tejano 101.7 launch party. The June 24 event will be a tribute to Gonzalez.

Controversies 
In April 1994, the bus driver for Mazz was convicted after the driver was found with 49 pounds of marijuana at the Falfurrias checkpoint. The group were in Chicago at the time of the arrest of their driver.

Joe Lopez Conviction and Sex Offender status 
In 2006, Joe Lopez was convicted of two counts of aggravated sexual assault of a child and a count of indecency with a child when his niece provided testimony against Lopez in court. Lopez originally was sentenced to 20 years but was paroled in February 2017. As the board was considering his parole, court documents showed that Lopez also fathered a child with another underage girl, who was 14 years old at the time. Since there were two separate instances of sex with underage girls, advocates objected to his parole.  

Lopez is required to register as sex offender for the rest of his life and can be found on the Texas Public Sex Offender Website.

Band members
First lineup (1978-1984):

Joe Lopez - vocals
Jimmy González - guitar and backup vocals (d. 2018)
Juan Murillo - bass and backup vocals
Hector Augusto Flores - keyboards
Adolfo Garcia: - drums

Second lineup (1984-1997):

 Joe Lopez - lead vocals
 Jimmy González - vocals and guitar (d. 2018)
 Tommie Gonzalez - conga and sax
 Alfonso Gonzalez (Super Boy) - accordion
 Frankie Caballero - accordion
 Robert Chavez- bass
 Mario Gonzalez - bass 
 Brando Mireles - keyboard
 Adolfo Garcia - drums
 Ricardo Barron - percussion
 Rebecca Valadez - vocals
 Homero Esquivel - accordion
Joe Lopez y La Nueva Imagen Mazz (1998 - 2006)

 Joe Lopez - lead vocals
 Brando Mireles - keyboard
 Richard Barron - Drums
 Larry Villanueva - Drums
 Ben Ramos - Keyboard / Accordion
 Danny Rodriguez - Bass
 Tony Cisneros - Guitar

Jimmy Gonzalez Y Grupo Mazz (1998 - 2017)

 Jimmy Gonzalez - Lead Vocals / Guitar
 Mike Gonzalez - Drums
 Adolfo Garcia - Drums
 Joseph Gonzalez - Percussion
 Johnny "Johnny Rod" Rodriguez - Keyboards
 Xavier Padilla - Keyboards
 Frankie Caballero - Accordion
 J.R. Gomez - Accordion
 Tommy Gonzalez - Saxophone
 Art Ramirez - Bass
 Carlos Gonzalez - Bass
 Jay Alaniz - Bass
 Joe B. - Vocals
 Danny Ortiz - Vocals
 Rebecca Valadez - Vocals
 Kaci Zavala - Vocals

Studio albums 
 1978: Mazz
 1978: Mas Mazz
 1979: El
 1980: Class
 1980: 1980
 1981: The Look of Mazz
 1982: Command Performance
 1982: Pesado
 1983: The Force
 1984: Standing Ovation
 1984: It's Bad!
 1985: The Bad Boys
 1985: Number 16
 1986: La Continuacion(Number 16 Part 2)
 1987: Dance Your Mazz Off
 1987: Beyond
 1989: Straight From The Heart
 1989: No Te Olvidaré
 1990: Para Nuestra Gente
 1991: Una Noche Juntos
 1992: Lo Hare Por Ti
 1993: Mazz Romanticos Que Nunca
 1993: Que Esperabas
 1994: Regalo de Navidad
 1995: Solo Para Ti
 1996: Mazz Mariachi y Traicion
 1997: Al Frente de Todos
 1998: Cuantas Veces

References

External links
 Jimmy Gonzalez My Space page
 Freddie Records
 Mazz history
 Additional history
 [ Allmusic]
 My Space fan page
 Web site of singer Rebecca Valadez
 Youtube - Jimmy Gonzalez y Mazz Hits

Latin Grammy Award winners
Musical groups from Texas
People from Brownsville, Texas
Tejano music groups